Presidential elections were held in Austria on 23 May 1965, following the death of incumbent President Adolf Schärf on 28 February. The result was a victory for Franz Jonas of the Socialist Party, who received 51% of the vote. Voter turnout was 96%.

Results

References

Presidential elections in Austria
President
Austria
Austria